Following is a list of virtual schools—coursework from an accredited private school or accredited not-for-profit or publicly funded institution, taught primarily through online methods. Schools are listed by country and by state or province. Within each geographic division, primary and secondary schools are listed first; colleges and universities are listed second.

Any of the thousands of commercial or unaccredited ventures that offer online courses should be listed elsewhere, under their relevant categories.

Australia
School of the Air
School of Isolated and Distance Education

Canada

Alberta
Athabasca University

British Columbia
BC Online School
Virtual School BC

Ontario
Public
Independent Learning Centre distance education high school credit courses
Peel District School Board continuing education online
Toronto District School Board virtual school
York Region District School Board continuing education e-learning, also known as night high school (uses D2L)

Private
Virtual High School

United States
Many of the schools listed below serve students nationally and internationally

Arizona
ASU Prep Digital
Northcentral University
Primavera Online High School

California
Apex Learning Virtual School
Capistrano Connections Academy
East Bay Innovation Academy
Stanford University Online High School
Laurel Springs School
University of the People

Florida
Florida Virtual School

Illinois
American School of Correspondence

Maryland
National Connections Academy

Minnesota
Cyber Village Academy Blended online & on campus 3–12
 Excel High School Accredited online 6–12
T4N Pinnacle Academy

Mississippi
University of Mississippi High School - Accredited by AdvancED and NCAA Core Course Approved

Nebraska
University of Nebraska High School

New Hampshire
Virtual Learning Academy Charter School

New York 
Dwight Global Online School

Ohio
Franklin University

Pennsylvania
There were 14 public cyber charter schools operating in Pennsylvania in 2013.
Keystone National High School
Penn Foster High School
Pennsylvania Cyber Charter School
Pennsylvania Leadership Charter School
Pennsylvania Virtual Charter School
SusQ Cyber Charter School

South Carolina
Provost Academy South Carolina
SC Whitmore School

Utah
Western Governors University

Virginia
University of Fairfax

West Virginia
CompuHigh/Whitmore School

Wisconsin 
Wisconsin Virtual Academy

References and External links 

Distance education institutions